Novo is a Portuguese and Galician surname. Notable people with the surname include:

Álvaro Novo (born 1978), Spanish footballer
Emanuel Novo (born 1992), Portuguese footballer
Nacho Novo (born 1979), Spanish footballer
Pelayo Novo (born 1990), Spanish footballer
Salvador Novo (1904–1974), Mexican writer and poet

Portuguese-language surnames
Galician-language surnames